Mesannepada, Mesh-Ane-pada or Mes-Anne-pada ("Youngling chosen by An") was the first king listed for the First Dynasty of Ur (c. 26th century BC) on the Sumerian king list. He is listed to have ruled for 80 years, having overthrown Lugal-kitun of Uruk: "Then Unug (Uruk) was defeated and the kingship was taken to Urim (Ur)". In one of his seals, found in the Royal Cemetery at Ur, he is also described as king of Kish.

Filiation

The "Treasure of Ur" discovered in Mari

Mesannepada was a son of Meskalamdug. A lapis-lazuli bead with the name of King Meskalamdug was found in Mari, in the so-called "Treasure of Ur", and reads:

Initially, it was thought that this bead (reference M. 4439) referred to a gift by Mesannepada to a king of Mari named Gansud or Ansud. This has now been corrected with the translation given above. The God "Lugal-kalam" ("Lord of the Land") to whom the dedication is made, is otherwise known in a dedication by a local ruler Šaba (Šalim) of Mari, also as Lugal-kalam, or in the dedication of Ishtup-Ilum where he is named "Lugal-mātim" ("Lord of the Land"), and is considered identical with the local deity Dagan, or Enlil. 

It is unclear how this bead came to be in Mari, but this points to some kind of relation between Ur and Mari at that time. The bead was discovered in a jar containing other objects from Ur or Kish, the so-called "Treasure of Ur". The jar was recognized as an offering for the foundation of a temple in Mari. Similar dedication beads have also been found from later rulers, such as Shulgi who engraved two carnelian beads with dedication to his gods circa 2100 BC.

A'annepada dedication tablet

Several dedication tablets by "A'annepada, son of Mesannepada" for the god Ninhursag are also known, which all have similar content:

Sumerian King List

Mesannepada appears in the Sumerian King List, as the first ruler of the First Dynasty of Ur, and is credited with a reign of 80 years. His successors are also named:

It is considered impossible for a king to inherit a throne in his childhood and reign thereafter for 80 years. The length of the son's reign was probably added to that of the father.

Old Babylonian tablet: the Tummal Chronicle
Mesannepada and his other son are also mentioned in an Old Babylonian tablet (1900-1600 BC), the Tummal Inscription, relating the accomplishments of several kings. Such tablets are usually copies of older tablets, now lost:

Reign
Mesannepada is associated with an expansion of Ur, at least diplomatically. A lapis-lazuli bead in the name of Mesannepada was found in Mari, and formed part of the "Treasure of Ur", made for the dedication of a temple in Mari. Seals from the royal cemetery at Ur have also been found bearing the names of Mesannepada and his predecessors Meskalamdug and Akalamdug, along with Queen Puabi. A seal impression in the name of "Mesannepada, king of Kish" was found in the Royal Cemetery at Ur.

Mesannepada, and his son and successor Meskiagnun, who reigned 36 years, are both named on the Tummal Inscription as upkeepers of the main temple in Nippur along with Gilgamesh of Uruk and his son Ur-Nungal, verifying their status as overlords of Sumer. Judging from the inscriptions, Mesannepada then assumed the title "King of Kish", to indicate his hegemony.

Another son of Mesannepada, named Aannepadda, (Aja-ane-pada or A-Anne-pada, "father chosen by An"), whose years of reigned are unknown, is known for having the temple of Ninhursag constructed (at modern Ubaid) near el-Obed, though he is not named on the kinglist.

A small ziggurat beneath the structure built at Ur by Ur-Nammu may date back to the time of Mes-Anne-pada.

In the 1950s, Edmund I. Gordon conjectured that Mesannepada, and an archaeologically attested early "king of Kish", Mesilim, were one and the same, as their names were interchanged in certain proverbs in later Babylonian tablets; however this has not proved conclusive. More recent scholars tend to regard them as distinct, usually placing Mesilim in Kish before Mesannepada.

Royal Cemetery of Ur
Mesannapeda's tomb may have been located in the Royal Cemetery at Ur. It has been suggested that tomb PG 1232, or PG 1237, nicknamed "the Great Death-Pit," might belong to him.

See also

History of Sumer

References

Bibliography 

 
 
 
 
 

Sumerian kings
26th-century BC Sumerian kings
Kings of Kish
First Dynasty of Ur